The Argyllshire by-election was a Parliamentary by-election held on 26 August 1903. The constituency returned one Member of Parliament (MP) to the House of Commons of the United Kingdom, elected by the first past the post voting system.

Vacancy
Donald Ninian Nicol had been Conservative MP for the seat of Argyllshire since the 1895 general election. He died on 27 July 1903 at the age of 60.

Electoral history
The seat had been Conservative since they gained it in 1895. They easily held the seat at the last election, with an increased majority;

Candidates
The local Conservative Association selected 63-year-old Charles Stewart as their candidate to defend the seat. He was a solicitor.

The local Liberal Association selected 59-year-old John Stirling Ainsworth as their candidate to gain the seat. Ainsworth contested the Barrow-in-Furness constituency at the 1886 general election and Argyllshire in 1900. He commanded the 3rd Volunteer Battalion, the Border Regiment from 1898-1902.

Campaign
Polling Day was fixed for the 26 August 1903, just 30 days after the previous MP died.

Result
The Liberals gained the seat from the Conservatives;

Aftermath
At the following General Election the result was;

References

1903 in Scotland
1900s elections in Scotland
1903 elections in the United Kingdom
By-elections to the Parliament of the United Kingdom in Scottish constituencies
Politics of Argyll and Bute